Kukah or Kookeh or Kukeh may refer to:
 Kukah, Markazi
 Kukeh, West Azerbaijan